Giant Coaster was a steel roller coaster located at Fuji-Q Highland in Fujiyoshida, Yamanashi, Japan. According to some sources (i.e. the roller coaster database), Giant Coaster was the longest roller coaster in the world when it opened due to the Guinness Book of World Records.

References  

Fuji-Q Highland
Roller coasters introduced in 1966
Roller coasters in Japan